Ilona Szabó de Carvalho (born May 31, 1978) is a Brazilian political scientist , and civic entrepreneur, co-founder and executive director of the Igarapé Institute. Since its founding in 2011, the Institute has developed pioneering research, new technologies, and policy on the intersections of security, climate and development. With headquarters in Rio de Janeiro, Igarapé is today ranked as one of the leading think tanks in the world , and works with governments, the private sector , and civil society to co-design data-driven partnerships and solutions to complex challenges. In 2020, she was the only Brazilian included on Prospect Magazine's list "The world’s top 50 thinkers 2020", amongst other "scientists, philosophers and writers reshaping our times". Her position among the top 50 was later revealed to be fifth place.

National and global networks 
Ilona is a globally recognized thought leader on issues of civic action, drug policy and violence prevention and reduction and has extensive experience leading national and global networks.

Between 2011 and 2016 she was the executive coordinator of the Global Commission on Drug Policy, a network of former presidents, entrepreneurs and public intellectuals. She previously coordinated the Latin American Commission on Drugs and Democracy. During her tenure she was responsible for helping shape global strategy with former presidents, supreme court justices, business and world leaders, including Fernando Henrique Cardoso, Cesar Gaviria, Richard Branson and the former UN Secretary General Kofi Annan.

Since 2015, she has been a Young Global Leader at the World Economic Forum and a Responsible Leader at the BMW Foundation. She is the co-founder of the AGORA movement that aims to shape and help implement a new vision and public policy agenda in Brazil, and she has launched a number of expert networks. In 2018 she was awarded the order of merit of Public Security, from the Brazilian Ministry of Public Security and the Office of the President of Brazil.

Between 2008 and 2011, she was the civil society liaise for the Geneva Declaration on Armed Violence and Development, working with diplomats and grass-roots organizations around the world.

In the mid-2000s while working for the NGO Viva Rio, Ilona coordinated one of the world’s largest disarmament campaigns and helped shape a national referendum to ban the sale of handguns to Brazilian citizens.

Education 
Ilona Szabó is currently a Senior Public Policy Fellow at Columbia University School of International Affairs and Public Administration (SIPA). She earned a Master’s Degree in International Studies at the Peace and Conflict Studies Department from the University of Uppsala in Sweden, a specialist degree in International Development, from the Oslo University and a Bachelor’s Degree in International Relations. She has joined several executive courses, such as in Global Leadership and Public Policy for the 21st Century at the Kennedy School at Harvard, Transformational Leadership at the Said Business School at Oxford University and a Management Course on Disarmament, Demobilization & Reintegration (DDR) at the Swedish National Defense College, Stockholm. In 1995 she spent a year at a Cultural Exchange Program in Latvia with the American Field Service (AFS).

Media 
Ilona is a columnist at Folha de S. Paulo. Between 2016 and 2018 Ilona Szabó was a commentator on the Estúdio i program, broadcast on GloboNews. She spoke at TED in 2014, and at Davos and other World Economic Forum events in 2016, 2017 and 2019. Ilona is routinely involved in overseeing communications and outreach on behalf of the Igarapé Institute. She is the author of two books: Drogas: As Histórias que Não te Contaram ("Drugs: The untold stories") and Segurança Pública para Virar o Jogo ("Public security to change the game"), published by Zahar in 2017 and 2018. She was the co-script writer and researcher for the award-winning documentary Breaking the Taboo.

Boards 
Ilona serves on the board of the Drug Policy Alliance and of the Brazilian Center for International Relations (CEBRI), on the advisory board of the Young Global Leaders of the World Economic Forum and presides the Public Security Council of the Rio de Janeiro State Industry Federation (FIRJAN). She was a mentor of the Columbia Women's leadership network in Brazil, served as an international jurist for the Bloomberg Mayors Challenge in Latin America and for the MacArthur’s Foundation $100 million dollar initiative – 100&Change.

Awards and recognition

Personal 

 Finalist for the “Claudia Magazine Award”, category public policy, 2019
 Order of merit of Public Security, Brazilian Ministry of Public Security and the Office of the President of Brazil, 2018
 Civic Entrepreneur, Political Action Network for Sustainability, 2016 
 Medalha Mulher Cidadã Heloneida Studart, Nova Friburgo City Council, 2016
 Young Global Leader, World Economic Forum, 2015
 Responsible Leader, BMW Foundation, 2015

Igarapé’s Institute Awards under her directorship 

 Nominated for the “Faz Diferença” award by O Globo newspaper (2020)
 Best Social Policy Think Tank, Prospect, 2019
 100 best NGOs in Brazil, Doar Institute, 2019
 Best Human Rights NGO in Brazil, Doar Institute, 2018
 100 best NGOs in Brazil, Doar Institute, 2018
 Schmidt Family Foundation Award, 2014
 Social Impact Challenge, Google Brazil, 2014

Brazilian National Council for Criminal and Penitentiary Policy 
In early 2019, Ilona was nominated by Brazilian Minister of Justice and Public Security Sérgio Moro to a voluntary advisory position at the Brazilian National Council for Criminal and Penitentiary Policy, a consulting board which conducts assessments of the penitentiary system, proposes criminal policy guidelines and do inspections of penal establishments, among other duties. Due to massive attacks  by extremists supporters of the Brazilian far-right government on social media, Ilona was removed from the council  by the minister on the order of President Jair Bolsonaro.

In April 2020, in the midst of the Covid-19 pandemic, Ilona was mentioned (for the third time) by the President during an official announcement regarding Moro's decision to resign. At the time, Bolsonaro made reference to Ilona's nomination to the Brazilian National Council for Criminal and Penitentiary Policy on national broadcast television with a misogynistic streak and misleading information. "To witness something so meaningless being used in such a  key moment is to understand that the speech was made to the President's constituency, the ones who need real or imaginary enemies. I am an imaginary piece in a chess game. And there is the gender issue, that is constantly present in the President's stance", said Ilona in an interview for the Brazilian magazine Época.

Family 
Ilona has a daughter and is married to Robert Muggah, a Canadian political scientist, urban specialist and co-founder of the Igarapé Institute.

Publications 

 What is Behind Brazil’s Homicide Decline? — Technical Note, Igarape Institute (2019; with Robert Muggah)
 Segurança Pública é Solução — Policy Paper, Igarape Institute (2018, editor)
 Rio Seguro — Policy Paper, Igarape Institute (editor, 2018)
 Making Cities Safer: Citizen Security Innovations from Latin America — Strategic Paper, Igarape Institute (2016; with Robert Muggah, Nathalie Alvarado, Lina Marmolejo and Ruddy Wangwith) 
 Measurement Matters: Designing New Metrics for a Drug Policy That Works — Strategic Paper, Igarape Institute (2015; with Robert Muggah and Katherine Aguirre) 
 Política de Drogas no Brasil: A Mudança Já Começou — Strategic Paper, Igarape Institute (2014; with Ana Paula Pellegrino)
 Taking Control: Pathways for Drug Policies that Work — Report, Global Commission on Drug Policy (2014)

References 

Brazilian political scientists
20th-century Brazilian women writers
Brazilian columnists
Brazilian women columnists
1978 births
Living people
21st-century Brazilian women writers
21st-century Brazilian writers
Brazilian people of Hungarian descent
Women political scientists